Acid perfusion test, also called the Bernstein test, is a test done to reproduce the pain when the lower esophagus is irrigated with an acid solution in people with GERD (gastroesophageal reflux disease).

There will be a negative result in normal people, but a false positive reading may be seen in up to 15% of people.

Bernstein test is simple and cheap but mostly obsolete nowadays. Esophageal pH monitoring is the gold standard for GERD. However, the initial management is with proton pump inhibitors. If the patient does not respond to it, and continues to have symptoms of GERD, i.e. heartburn, hoarseness, chronic cough, then 24 hr pH monitoring should be considered.

References

Medical tests